The 1990/91 FIS Freestyle Skiing World Cup was the twelfth World Cup season in freestyle skiing organised by International Ski Federation. The season started on 30 November 1990 and ended on 23 March 1991. This season included four disciplines: aerials, moguls, ballet and combined.

Men

Aerials

Ballet

Moguls

Combined

Ladies

Aerials

Ballet

Moguls

Combined

Men's standings

Overall 

Standings after 50 races.

Moguls 

Standings after 12 races.

Aerials 

Standings after 13 races.

Ballet 

Standings after 13 races.

Combined 

Standings after 12 races.

Ladies' standings

Overall 

Standings after 50 races.

Moguls 

Standings after 12 races.

Aerials 

Standings after 13 races.

Ballet 

Standings after 13 races.

Combined 

Standings after 12 races.

References

FIS Freestyle Skiing World Cup
World Cup
World Cup